Sophie Megan Hahn,  (born 23 January 1997) is a parasport athlete from England competing mainly in T38 sprint events. In 2013, she qualified for the 2013 IPC Athletics World Championships, selected for the T38 100m and 200m. She took the gold in the 100m sprint, setting a new world record.

In 2018, she won the gold medal in the T38 100 metres for women at the Commonwealth Games; in doing so she became the first female track and field athlete to hold gold medals in the same event from the World Championships, Paralympic Games, European Championships and Commonwealth Games, mirroring in parasports the achievements of fellow Paralympian Dan Greaves, and Olympic champions Daley Thompson, Linford Christie, Sally Gunnell, Jonathan Edwards and Greg Rutherford

Career history
Hahn, who has cerebral palsy, came into athletics at the age of 15. Enthused by the 2012 Summer Paralympics in London, her older brother, knowing of her pace as a runner encouraged her to seek an athletics club. Her mother got in touch with her nearest club and Hahn was called in for trials and accepted by coach Joseph McDonnell. Her first competitive races occurred in 2013, and in the Charnwood Athletics warm up she took the 100m and 200m races. After entering several tournaments in June, she broke onto the British sprinting scene by taking first place at the England Athletics Senior Disability Championships, winning both 100m (13.27s) and 200m (27.88s).

Selected for the IPC World Championships in Lyon in the T38, Hahn was entered in both the 100m and 200m in the T38 classification. On 21 July, she won her qualifying heat of the 200m with a time of 27.56. In the final she was beaten by Brazil's Verônica Hipólito, but held on to take the silver medal. On 23 July she qualified for the 100m sprint, this time coming in second. The next day, on the final, Hahn ran a world record time of 13.10s, beating Hipolito into second place. Hahn won the 100m as the only athlete starting from a standing position.

In May 2014, Hahn's world record was broken by Russia's Margarita Goncharova. However, just 24 hours later, Hahn broke it back in Loughborough taking her personal best down to 13.04 in the process.

In her first ever IPC European Championships, Hahn won three silver medals in Swansea. The Loughborough-based athlete finished narrowly behind Goncharova in the 100m and the 400m – only her second run over the distance. The quartet of Olivia Breen, Bethany Woodward, Hahn and Jenny McLoughlin were narrowly edged out by the Russian team in the T35-38 4 × 100 m, but set a national record of 53.84 in the process.
In 2018, Hahn had her impairment classification questioned by the father of a rival, Olivia Breen. At a Parliamentary select committee, Michael Breen claimed Hahn had been misclassified and was getting an unfair advantage.

In June 2021 she was among the first dozen athletes chosen for the UK athletics team at the postponed 2020 Paralympics in Tokyo.

References

External links 
 
 
 

1997 births
English female sprinters
Living people
World record holders in Paralympic athletics
British disabled sportspeople
Sportswomen with disabilities
Track and field athletes with cerebral palsy
Athletes (track and field) at the 2016 Summer Paralympics
Medalists at the 2016 Summer Paralympics
Paralympic gold medalists for Great Britain
Paralympic silver medalists for Great Britain
Members of the Order of the British Empire
Commonwealth Games medallists in athletics
Commonwealth Games gold medallists for England
Athletes (track and field) at the 2018 Commonwealth Games
World Para Athletics Championships winners
Paralympic medalists in athletics (track and field)
Paralympic athletes of Great Britain
British Athletics Championships winners
Athletes (track and field) at the 2020 Summer Paralympics
Medallists at the 2018 Commonwealth Games